Bunty Pulls the Strings is a lost 1921 American silent comedy film directed by Reginald Barker and starring Leatrice Joy. It is based on a Broadway play by Graham Moffat. On stage the part of Bunty was played and made famous by Molly Pearson. The film was produced and distributed by Goldwyn Pictures.

Cast
Leatrice Joy as Bunty
Russell Simpson as Tammas Biggar
Raymond Hatton as Weelum
Cullen Landis as Rab
Casson Ferguson as Jeemy
Josephine Crowell as Susie Simpson
Edythe Chapman as Eelen Dunlap
Roland Rushton as Minister
Georgia Woodthorpe as Mrs. Drummon
Sadie Gordon as Maggie
Otto Hoffman as Beadle

References

External links

 

1921 films
American silent feature films
Lost American films
Films directed by Reginald Barker
Goldwyn Pictures films
American black-and-white films
Silent American comedy films
1921 comedy films
1921 lost films
Lost comedy films
1920s American films